Leamersville is an unincorporated community and census-designated place (CDP) in Blair County, Pennsylvania, United States. It was first listed as a CDP prior to the 2020 census.

The CDP is in southern Blair County, in the northeastern part of Freedom Township. It is bordered to the northeast by Blair Township, to the east by the Frankstown Branch of the Juniata River, to the south by Pennsylvania Route 164, to the west by Dunnings Highway (old U.S. Route 220), to the south again by Brethren Lane, and to the northwest by Interstate 99/US 220.

Demographics

References 

Census-designated places in Blair County, Pennsylvania
Census-designated places in Pennsylvania